Hans Claussen (5 September 1911 – 21 July 2001) was a German weightlifter. He competed in the men's light heavyweight event at the 1952 Summer Olympics.

References

1911 births
2001 deaths
German male weightlifters
Olympic weightlifters of Germany
Weightlifters at the 1952 Summer Olympics
Sportspeople from Lübeck